Daydream Anonymous is the third studio album by InMe and was released on  10 September 2007. It is the first album to feature Greg McPherson (Dave's younger brother) on bass. Following the release the band got back out on tour starting at Wolverhampton Wulfrun Hall on 15 September 2007.

History
On 7 December 2006, the band announced over MySpace that their new album will be called Daydream Anonymous. They also placed four demos on their MySpace page: "Myths and Photographs", "I Won't Let Go", "Soldier" and "Raindrops on Stones", all recorded using Dave McPherson's Mac.

The album debuted at number 72 on the UK Albums chart, and reached number 2 on the UK Rock Albums chart.

Track listing
Between the first release of a track list and the release of the album itself, a few track names were changed. Most notably a track titled "Ya Ya Serenade (Ameranth)" became "In Loving Memory".

 Myths & Photographs
 Far-Reaching
 I Won't Let Go
 Turbulence
 Cracking the Whip
 In Loving Memory
 Daydream Anonymous
 Here's Hoping
 Rain Drops on Stones
 Thanks for Leaving Me
 Soldier
 2nd Jonquil
 A Toast to Broken Glass
 Papillons Stalemate [Limited Edition]

References

2007 albums
InMe albums